This is a survey of the postage stamps and postal history of Tajikistan.

Tajikistan, officially the Republic of Tajikistan, is a mountainous landlocked country in Central Asia. Once part of the Samanid Empire, Tajikistan became a constituent republic of the Soviet Union in the 20th century, known as the Tajik Soviet Socialist Republic (Tajik SSR). It became independent in 1991.

First stamps 
The first stamps of Tajikistan were issued on 20 May 1992. Before then, Tajikistan used stamps of the Soviet Union.

Overprints 
In 1992 and 1993 the Tajikistan Post Office resorted to overprinting stamps of the Soviet Union as supplies of the new Tajik stamps ran low.

Bogus stamps 
Tajikistan is a member of the Universal Postal Union and has issued notices through the U.P.U. warning of bogus stamps on popular thematic subjects issued in their name.

See also 
List of people on stamps of Tajikistan

References

External links

Tajik Post (Russian language)

Communications in Tajikistan
Tajikistan